Zarung is a village located in Sikkim, India. It belongs to the Ravong Tehsil  of South Sikkim.

Demographics
The total population of Zarung village is 874. 468 are males and 406 are females, thus the average male to female sex ratio is 868, where's the child sex ratio of the village is 831. According to the 2011 Indian census the literacy rate of Zarung is 66.4 percent which is lower literacy rate compared to 72.7 percent of South Sikkim.

References

Villages in Namchi district